Love & Hip Hop: Miami is the fourth installment of the Love & Hip Hop reality television franchise. It premiered on January 1, 2018, on VH1 and chronicles the lives of several people in the Miami area involved with hip hop music. The show features appearances from notable figures associated with Southern hip hop, as well as Latin music and reggaeton.

On July 11, 2022, VH1 announced that additional episodes of season four would air from August 8, 2022.

Development
Producers first considered a Love & Hip Hop spin-off set in Miami in 2012, before settling on Atlanta instead, with producer Stefan Springman revealing in the behind-the-scenes special Love & Hip Hop: Dirty Little Secrets: "we found great characters there but it just didn't feel right". Several episodes in Love & Hip Hop: New York second season were filmed in Miami, originally intended to set up a spin-off starring Teairra Marí and Erica Mena. On July 4, 2014, Scott-Young discussed expanding the franchise to other cities: "we have looked at a bunch of other cities, Miami I’ve looked at as well, so we’re always looking to expand." On November 20, 2014, rapper Trina revealed she had turned down an offer for Love & Hip Hop: Miami.

On February 28, 2016, it was reported that potential spin-offs set in Miami and Houston were in pre-production and the producers were auditioning potential cast members. In April 2016, Trick Daddy and Trina confirmed their involvement in Love & Hip Hop: Miami, despite the latter turning down the offer years earlier. Filming was set to begin in May 2016, with Trick's storyline centered on managing his artists Mike Smiff and Love & Hip Hop: Atlantas PreMadonna. Plies, Brianna Perry and PreMadonna's husband Buck Thomas were also reported to be cast members at this time, however all their scenes were left on the cutting room floor during the show's nearly two year development and filming process. On April 20, 2017, after over a year of development hell, it was reported that the show's producers had been granted permission to start filming in South Florida. At some point, the show's producers approached Gucci Mane and his fiancée Keyshia Ka'oir to star in the series, however they turned it down to film a wedding special for BET.

On May 8, 2017, Gunplay appeared on Love & Hip Hop: Atlanta, leading to speculation that his appearance was intended to set up Love & Hip Hop: Miami.

On August 25, 2017, VH1 announced Love & Hip Hop: Miami would make its series premiere on January 1, 2018.

Series synopsis

Overview and casting

Love & Hip Hop: Miami revolves around the personal and professional struggles of several rappers, singers and socialites in Miami's music scene. The series is notable for its diverse cast, which reflects Miami's racially and economically diverse community. It has a sprawling supporting cast, who (in most cases) share the same amount of screen time and storyline focus as the show's leads.

The original cast consisted of Trina, Trick Daddy, Gunplay, Afro-Latina singer Amara La Negra, Cuban-Venezuelan rapper Veronica Vega, openly gay rapper Bobby Lytes, socialite and party promoter Prince, and Flavor of Loves Shay Johnson. The first season's supporting cast would include Steph Lecor, Latin trap producer Young Hollywood, Keyara Stone, urban model and girlfriend of Gunplay, Grammy Award-nominated singer Pleasure P and his Pretty Ricky bandmate Baby Blue Whoaaaa, stripper-turned rapper Miami Tip, Joy Young, estranged wife of Trick Daddy, celebrity stylist Jojo Zarur, Jeffrey White, JT Money's openly gay son and boyfriend of Bobby Lytes, stylist Malik Williams, DJ Michelle Pooch, Prince's girlfriend Liz Cifuentes, model Gabby Davis, and mother-and-daughter brand ambassadors Chinese Kitty and Chinese Nicky. Although not mentioned in the initial cast announcement, Amara's mother Mami Ana and Jojo's mother Faride Nemer would appear in minor supporting roles. Love & Hip Hop: New Yorks Juju C. and Love & Hip Hop: Atlantas Lil Scrappy would make special crossover appearances.

On November 19, 2018, VH1 confirmed that nearly all of the show's cast would return for a second season, with Jojo promoted to the main cast. New supporting cast members would include Haitian-American comedienne Jessie Woo, rapper Khaotic and Spectacular of Pretty Ricky. Khaotic made headlines during filming, after he was allegedly involved in a hit-and-run incident.

On November 15, 2019, Jojo Zarur announced that the show would return on January 6, 2020. On December 9, 2019, VH1 confirmed the season's premiere date, along with a promo featuring new cast members Sukihana, Brisco, Hood Brat and waist trainer entrepreneur PreMadonna, who had previously been attached to the show when it first started filming in 2016. Jojo would return in a supporting role, while Veronica Vega left the series entirely. Prince, Gunplay and Baby Blue Whoaaaa, Pleasure P and Spectacular of Pretty Ricky filmed scenes for the season and were included as cast members in the season's press release, however were cut from the season when it eventually aired.  On December 11, 2019, VH1 announced the return of Love & Hip Hop: Atlantas Joseline Hernandez to the franchise, who would join the cast alongside Shay Johnson's brother EmJay Johnson and model Nikki Natural, while rapper KaMillion and social media personality Saucy Santana, best known for his friendship with Yung Miami of City Girls, would appear as recurring guest stars. Despite being credited as a main cast member for the entire season and heavily featured in its promotional material, Joseline disappeared from the show entirely after four episodes, after a series of interviews in which she criticised producer Mona Scott-Young.

After over a year long hiatus due to the COVID-19 pandemic, the show was retooled for season four, with only Trina, Amara, Trick and Sukihana returning to the main cast. New cast members include Ace Hood and his wife Shelah Marie, Noreaga and his wife Neri, and Florence El Luche. Bobby Lytes was demoted to supporting cast, along with Florence's sister Gaelle and husband Marlon, Suki's fiancé Kill Bill and cousin Isaiah, Trina's boyfriend Raymond Taylor and manager C.O. Love & Hip Hop: Hollywood Ray J and Princess Love make crossover appearances. The season continued a year later without Ace and Shelah, and with the return of Shay Johnson in a supporting role.

Cast timeline
  Main cast (appears in opening credits) 
  Secondary cast (appears in green screen confessional segments and in end credits alongside the main cast)
  Guest cast (appears in a guest role or cameo)

Note:

Storylines
The premiere episode deals with colorism and eurocentrism within the Latin community, including a scene where light-skinned producer Young Hollywood criticises dark-skinned singer Amara La Negra's afro.

Reception

Critical response
Ebony praised the show and Afro-Latina star Amara La Negra for "inviting cultural conversations" about misogynoir and the underrepresentation of black Latinas in mainstream entertainment, hoping the franchise would continue to go in a more "conscious" direction. La Negra was dubbed by Billboard as the show's "breakout star", landing a multi-album record deal with BMG hours after the show's premiere. However, the show was not well-received by some Miami locals, including Khia and TS Madison who reviewed it negatively on their web show The Queen's Court, comparing it to a "telemundo" and criticising the casting and production values, with Khia stating "they had everything bad but a bad bitch on there".

Ratings
The series premiere garnered 1.8 million viewers, making it VH1's best launch since Hip Hop Squares the previous year. The show has struggled with ratings overall compared to its predecessors, which has been attributed to its confusing scheduling changes, having had several different time slots in season two, before settling on Monday nights after Love & Hip Hop: New York.

Episodes

Broadcast history
On November 19, 2018, VH1 announced that Love & Hip Hop: Miami would be returning for a second season on January 2, 2019.

On December 9, 2019, VH1 announced that Love & Hip Hop: Miami would be returning for a third season on January 6, 2020.

On August 9, 2021, VH1 announced that Love & Hip Hop: Miami would return for a fourth season on August 23, 2021.

Distribution
Love & Hip Hop: Miami episodes air regularly on VH1 in the United States. Episodes run from around 41–44 minutes and are broadcast in high definition. The series' episodes are also available on demand through the official VH1 website, as well as for digital download at the iTunes Store and Amazon.

The show has never been released on DVD and episodes are currently only available on digital platforms.

Internationally, the first season is available uncensored on Hayu.

Censored seasons 1 and 2 are available to stream on Paramount+.

References

External links
 
 Love & Hip Hop: Miami at VH1.com

Love & Hip Hop
2010s American reality television series
2010s LGBT-related reality television series
2020s American reality television series
2020s LGBT-related reality television series
2018 American television series debuts
African-American reality television series
American LGBT-related reality television series
Television shows set in Miami
VH1 original programming
Reality television spin-offs
Hip hop television
English-language television shows
Television productions postponed due to the COVID-19 pandemic
American television spin-offs